Helga Nowotny (born 1937) is Professor emeritus of Social Studies of Science, ETH Zurich. She has held numerous leadership roles on Academic boards and public policy councils, and she has authored many publications in the social studies of science and technology.

Early life 
Nowotny grew up in Vienna, Austria during World War II. In interviews, she has recalled first wanting to become a scientist at the age of 8, when she was sent to Vorarlberg, the westernmost province of Austria, and quickly learned the local dialect.

Nowotny received her doctorate of jurisprudence at the University of Vienna in 1959. After completing her degree, she faced opposition to her application for an assistant professorship in the Department of Criminology there on the basis of her being a woman. She agreed with the hiring professor that if a more capable man applied for the position, he could have the job. In the end, she was hired to the position. It was there that she became interested in the sociology of science. In 1965, she moved to New York City with her husband, where she enrolled in a sociology doctoral program. There, she met Paul Lazarsfeld and Robert K. Merton, who mentored her throughout her education.

In 1969, Nowotny earned her Ph.D. in sociology at Columbia University, New York, where she completed her thesis on macrosociology and its methodology. She returned to Vienna to work as an associate professor at the Institute for Advanced Studies.

Research and publications
Nowotny's work in the 1970s and 1980s includes topics such as scientific controversies and technological risks, social time, coping with uncertainty, self-organization in science and gender relations in science, resulting in major monographs, co-edited and edited books and numerous articles. In 1989, she published the book Eigenzeit (English title: Time: The Modern and Postmodern Experience), which has since been translated into several languages.

Between 1992 and 1995 Helga Nowotny has been President of the International Society for the Study of Time. 
From the 1990s onwards she focused her research activities on new topics in social studies of science and technology. She conducted an empirical study on the discovery of high-superconductivity research and its impact on research policy (with Ulrike Felt) and increasingly on the changing relationship between science and society.

In 1994 Nowotny helped coin the term “Mode 2” for a new mode of applied research focused on solving specific problems. By contrast, “Mode 1” is basic research done within disciplines, initiated by the interest of the investigator, not from external demand.

Research policy

Next to her teaching and research activities, carried out at several universities and research institutions in Europe, Nowotny had always been intensely engaged in research policy. From 1985-1992 she was Chair of the Standing Committee for the Social Sciences of the European Science Foundation. She has been chair and member of the scientific advisory boards of numerous research institutions and policy-related committees throughout Europe. From 2001 until early 2006 she was Chair of EURAB, the European Research Advisory Board of the European Commission.

Nowotny is one of the founding members of the European Research Council, which has been established to fund frontier research at EU level based on the sole criteria of scientific excellence and pan-European competition. There she served as the Vice President and in February 2010, Nowotny was unanimously elected to the position of President of the European Research Council after the resignation of the founding president, Fotis Kafatos. As president of the ERC, she promoted increases in research funding across Europe, and advised new EU member states to increase funding support for their own research programs to prevent a "brain drain". She held the position until December 2013.

In 2014, Nowotny was appointed chair of the ERA Council Forum Austria, which advises the Austrian Ministry of Science and Research at the interface of European and national research policy.

Currently, Nowotny is Chair of the International Advisory Board of the University of Vienna. In 2020, she was appointed by European Commissioner for Innovation, Research, Culture, Education and Youth Mariya Gabriel to chair an independent search committee for the next president of the ERC.

Professional positions 
In 1981-1982 and 2003-2004 Nowotny was a Fellow at the Wissenschaftskolleg zu Berlin and from 1992-1999 Permanent Fellow at Collegium Budapest/Institute of Advanced Study. Before moving to ETH Zurich, she was Professor and Head of the newly founded Institute for Theory and Social Studies of Science of the University of Vienna.

From 1998 on, Nowotny was Director of the Collegium Helveticum at ETH Zurich. She was the founding director of the post-graduate fellowship programme based at ETH “Society in science: the Branco Weiss Fellowship” until 2004, when she returned to her native Vienna. From 2008 to 2014, Nowotny was a member of the Holberg Committee, which awards the Holberg prize to scholars who have made outstanding contributions to research in the arts and humanities, social sciences, law or theology.

Nowotny has held teaching and research positions at the Institute of Advanced Study in Vienna, King's College, Cambridge, UK, the University of Bielefeld, the Wissenschaftszentrum Berlin and the École des Hautes Études en Sciences Sociales in Paris. Nowotny is vice president of the council for the Lindau Nobel Laureate Meetings.

Awards and prizes 
Nowotny is a Member of Academia Europaea and Foreign Member of the Royal Swedish Academy of Sciences since 2006. Among other honours she has been awarded the J.D. Bernal Prize for her lifelong achievements in social studies of science. In October 2015, she received an honorary doctorate at the University of Bergen. She has also received an honorary doctorate from the Weizmann Institute of Science and the University of Twente.

In September 2017, she was awarded the President's Medal of the British Academy "for her contribution to the founding and shaping of the European Research Council, and positively influencing the shape of research funding and research policy in the UK and Europe".

Selected bibliography

Books 
 
 
  Pdf of book contents.
 
 
  Conference details: Cultures of technology and the quest for innovation, Kulturwissenschaftliches Institut (KWI) in Essen, Germany, April 2003.

Journal articles and book chapters
 
 
 
 
 
 
 .

References

External links
Personal homepage
ERC homepage

Austrian sociologists
Sociology of science
1937 births
Living people
Members of Academia Europaea
Members of the Royal Swedish Academy of Sciences
Austrian women sociologists
Austrian people of Czech descent
Recipients of the President's Medal (British Academy)
Academic staff of ETH Zurich